Eugene Viktorovich Koonin (Russian: Евге́ний Ви́кторович Ку́нин; born October 26, 1956) is a Russian-American biologist and Senior Investigator at the National Center for Biotechnology Information (NCBI). He is a recognised expert in the field of evolutionary and computational biology.

Education
Koonin gained a Master of Science in 1978 and a PhD in 1983 in molecular biology, both from the Department of Biology at Moscow State University. His PhD thesis, titled "Multienzyme organization of encephalomyocarditis virus replication complexes", was supervised by Vadim I. Agol.

Research
From 1985 until 1991, Koonin worked as a research scientist in computational biology in the Institutes of Poliomyelitis and Microbiology at the USSR Academy of Medical Sciences, studying virus biochemistry and bacterial genetics. In 1991, Koonin moved to the NCBI, where he has held a Senior Investigator position since 1996.

Koonin's principal research goals include the comparative analysis of sequenced genomes and automatic methods for genome-scale annotation of gene functions. He also researches in the application of comparative genomics for phylogenetic analysis, reconstruction of ancestral life forms and building large-scale evolutionary scenarios, as well as mathematical modeling of genome evolution. Koonin's research also investigates computational study of the major transitions in the evolution of life (such as the origin of eukaryotes), the evolution of eukaryotic signaling and developmental pathways from the comparative-genomic perspective.

Career
Koonin has worked as Adjunct Professor at the Georgia Institute of Technology, Boston University and the University of Haifa.

As of 2014, Koonin serves on the advisory editorial board of Trends in Genetics, and is co-Editor-in-Chief of the open access journal Biology Direct. He served on the editorial board of Bioinformatics from 1999 until 2001. Koonin is also an advisory board member in bioinformatics at Faculty of 1000.

In 2016 he was elected to the National Academy of Sciences.

In 2016, Semantic Scholar AI program included Koonin on its list of top ten most influential biomedical researchers.

Political positions 
In February 2022, he signed an open letter by Russian scientists condemning the 2022 Russian invasion of Ukraine, and renounced his membership in the Russian Academy of Sciences out of protest.

References

Selected bibliography
  HAL Id: 02861246.

External links

1956 births
Living people
Theoretical biologists
Russian bioinformaticians
Extended evolutionary synthesis
Human Genome Project scientists
Members of the United States National Academy of Sciences
Foreign Members of the Russian Academy of Sciences
21st-century American biologists
Moscow State University alumni
Russian activists against the 2022 Russian invasion of Ukraine